Alain Mion (born January 14, 1947 in Casablanca) is a French pianist, composer, arranger, and jazz singer.

Musical career 
Influenced by Bobby Timmons, Ray Charles and Les McCann, his style varies between jazz, soul jazz and "funky music".

He created the jazz funk group Cortex in 1974, before embarking upon a career under his own name in 1982.

His albums are known worldwide, notably "Troupeau Bleu" and "Volume 2" with Cortex (re-released several times and sampled by many musical artists and DJs). Also popular were albums under his own name, including "Pheno-Men" which was used as a theme for many radio programs, "Alain Mion in New York" recorded with David Binney and Marc Johnson, and "Some Soul Food" recorded in Stockholm (Sweden) with Patrik Boman and Ronnie Gardiner.

In 2008, he appeared with a new group, Alain Mion FunKey Combo (with German drummer Michael Kerstin, Swedish bassist Patrik Boman, and a saxophone section consisting of Italian and French musicians: Loïc Soulat on alto, Pietro Tonolo on tenor and Romano Pratesi on baritone) then with his new group Alain Mion & The New Cortex which reunited for concerts at New Morning in 2009-10, with the singer Adeline de Lépinay reprising the role originally performed by Mireille Dalbray on the Troupeau Bleu album.

Filmed in concert and broadcast by Mezzo TV, the group's repertoire included both new and old compositions of Alain Mion, reflected in the new album "Let's Groove", released on Trad Vibe Records and presented during a concert in Paris at Petit Journal Montparnasse en 2012.

In the United States, Alain Mion and Cortex's songs have been sampled by several hip-hop artists (including Madlib, Fat Joe, DJ Day, MF DOOM, Wiz Khalifa, Curren$y, Mellowhype,  Tyler The Creator, Rick Ross, and Lupe Fiasco).

Alain Mion's and Cortex's records are often played on contemporary jazz stations such as KCRW in Los Angeles and The Jazz Groove Radio in San Francisco.

2022, After several sold out concerts in Europe, Alain Mion has signed exclusively with Mark Green's Celebrity Talent Agency, NYC. First American tour of Cortex "Troupeau Bleu" * expected in September and October (CITY HALL WILIAMSBOURG, New York, DESERT DAZE FESTIVAL, Perris, LODGE ROOM, Los Angeles, UC THEATRE, Berkeley, EMPTY BOTTLE, Chicago...) produced in large part by Art Don't Sleep which announces several dates already sold out.

 Troupeau Bleu USA Tour : Alain Mion, Maeva Borzakian, Mohamed Ouaraz, Loic Soulat, Cedric Affre.

Discography

With Cortex 

 Troupeau Bleu (Sonodisc) LP
 Mary & Jeff (Sonodisc) Single
 Les Oiseaux Morts (Sonodisc) Single
 Vol. 2 (Sonodisc) LP
 Caribou (Arabella/Wea) Single
 Pourquoi (Crypto/RCA) LP
 Meddley : Mary & Jeff-Devil's Dance (Sonodisc) Maxi
 Cuvée Spéciale (Compilation Crypto/RCA) LP
 Best of Cortex (Jazz'in/Next Music) CD
 Cortex Inédit '79 (Underdog Records) CD + digital album
 Cortex Inédit '79 "Japanese limited edition" + bonus track(Underdog Records) LP
 The Unreleased Versions : "Les Oiseaux Morts" + "Mary & Jeff" (Trad Vibe) Single

Under his own name 

 Phéno-Men, T.Bones Square (Caravage/Carrere) Single
 Phéno-Men, All Along (Caravage/Carrere) Maxi
 Phéno-Men (Caravage/Carrere) LP+K7
 No'Mad, Un autre Be Bop (Olivi/Media7) Single
 No'Mad (Olivi/Media7) LP+CD
 Alain Mion in New York (Elabeth/DAM)CD
 Some Soul Food (Caravage/Jazz'in/Next Music) CD
 Alain Mion Solo CD à paraître
 Alain Mion Trio live on tour in Europe (Underdog Rec)CD
 Alain Mion & His FunKey Combo, Groovin’ in Paris (Caravage/Believe) digital album
 Alain Mion & The New Cortex "Let's Groove" (Trad Vibe Records) LP

Re-releases 

 Cortex Troupeau Bleu(Pulp Flavor) CD et Vinyl
 Cortex Volume 2 (Follow Me Records/Nocturne), CD et Vinyl
 Alain Mion in New York (Jazz'in/Next Music) CD
 Some Soul Food (Ward Records Japan) CD
 Pheno-Men (Caravage/Believe) digital album
 Some Soul Food (Caravage/Believe) digital album 
 Alain Mion in New York (Caravage/Believe) digital album 
 Cortex Troupeau Bleu nouvelle réédition (Underdog Rec) CD + Vinyle + digital album
 Cortex Pourquoi (Trad Vibe) LP + CD + digital
 Trilogie de Cortex (Troupeau Bleu, Vol.2, Pourquoi)  Trad Vibe Records/Pusher Distribution, Vinyle et CD

Other albums and compilations 

 La Guêpe, Vol.1 (Pulp Flavor) CD et VinyleSavoir Faire (Plein Gaz Productions) CD et Vinyle
 Opération Heritage (Hutch Productions) Vinyle
 Sound of Music (Galaxy Music) CD
 Compilation Park Hyatt Tokyo Airflow (Milan Music/Universal)CD et Vinyle
 Compilation Nightmares on Wax "Late Night Tales" (Azuli Records), en compagnie de Quincy Jones, et Tom Scott - CD et Vinyle
 Sensations Louisiane (Warner Music) CD 
 Jazz Bar 2005 (Disk Union TOKYO) CD 
 French Groovy Jazz (Caravage/Believe) digital album
 French Cool Jazz (Caravage/Believe) digital album
 French Latin Jazz (Caravage/Believe) digital album
 Coffret "5 CD Gospel"(Warner Music) CD
 French Piano Jazz (Caravage/Believe) digital album
 French Organ Jazz (Caravage/Believe) digital album
 French Blue Jazz (Caravage/Believe) digital album
 Timeless, Park Hyatt Paris Vendôme (Discograph)CD
 Music for silent movies, vol. 2 (Caravage/Believe) digital album
 Modern Gospel & Negro spirituals(Caravage/Believe) digital album

External links 
 Site d'Alain Mion

French jazz pianists
French male pianists
French jazz singers
1947 births
Living people
21st-century pianists
21st-century French male musicians
French male jazz musicians